Émile Gilliéron (1850–1924) was a Swiss artist and archaeological draftsman best known for his reconstructions of Mycenaean and Minoan artifacts from the Bronze Age.

Education and experience 
Émile Gilliéron studied at the trade school in Basel from 1872 to 1874, the Art Academy in Munich from 1875 to 1876, and finally at the studio of Isidore Pils in Paris from 1875 to 1877. In 1877, Gilliéron relocated to Athens where he began his career as an archaeological artist who produced drawings for Greek and foreign excavators, designed commemorative postage stamps for the inaugural Olympic Games (1896 and 1906), and served as an art tutor for the royal family of George I.

Professional life 
Émile Gilliéron worked as an archaeological illustrator for Heinrich Schliemann and gained a reputation for being widely recognized as the best archaeological illustrator working in Greece at the time. This reputation helped Gilliéron acquire a position assisting with fresco reconstructions at the excavation at Tiryns from 1910-1912. Gilliéron also became the chief restorer for Arthur Evans at the Palace of Minos at Knossos on Crete. For over three decades, Gilliéron worked with his son, and predecessor, also named Émile, creating reproductions of frescoes and other artifacts for Arthur Evans. The Gilliérons can be recognized as contributing many illustrations to Evan's four-volume book, The Palace of Minos at Knossos. Some of the most famous reconstructions by the Gilliérons include the Priest King fresco, the Ladies in Blue fresco, and the painting of the throne room at the Palace of Minos. Émile Gilliéron and his son formed a family business known as E. Gillieron & Son where they sold original commissioned watercolors and other reproductions made directly from originals on Skoufa Street in Athens. The Gilliérons created replicas of metal artifacts based on molds of the original masks, weapons, and vessels. They also created full-scale copies of Minoan frescoes on watercolor paper and created three-dimensional reconstructions in plaster form. By 1911 the Gilliérons had a catalog of Mycenaean antiquities consisting of over 144 pieces that could be manufactured in Germany by the Wurtemburg Electro Plate Company. The Gilliérons reworked molds taken from original antiquities to recreate an object in its undamaged form. The Gilliérons created two reconstructions of the well-known “Mask of Agamemnon” from Shaft Grave V in Grave Circle A at Mycenae, one which represented how the mask looked when it was found, and one restored to look like the believed original appearance.

Criticisms 
The work of the Gilliérons can be attributed to influencing the spread of Aegean art and creating an impression of Minoan culture but the validity of the reconstructions has long been debated. The Priest King fresco, believed by Arthur Evans to depict one of the rulers of ancient Knossos, was created by piecing fragments of the original together and has been scrutinized as containing contemporary influences that were allegedly much different from the original. Other reconstructions by the Gilliérons fall under similar scrutiny, such as the Bull Leapers fresco, which may have been given the addition of a modern border. Émile Gilliéron's reconstruction of the Saffron Gatherer fresco has been proven to be incorrect, as it originally depicted a monkey, not a boy. In addition to restorations and reconstructions, it has been a matter of ongoing research whether the Gilliérons were also involved in the forgery business producing fakes with their Greek assistants. Some of the artifacts attributed to the Gilliérons and under suspicion of forgery include the chryselephantine snake goddesses, the Ring of Minos and the Ring of Nestor, and the well-known Phaistos disc on Crete.

Death and acknowledgements 
Émile Gilliéron made and sold reproductions to museums and private collections all over the world up until his death in 1939. Since then The National Museum in Athens has had a gallery devoted to Gilliéron’s replicas of the Greek Bronze Age. Despite scrutiny of validity and questions of forgery, his reproductions remain valuable representations of ancient artistic achievements.

References

External links 
 Pieces of Emile Gilliéron in the Metropolitan Museum
 Seán Hemingway: Historic Images of the Greek Bronze Age on the website of the Metropolitan Museum of Art
 Historic Images of the Greek Bronze Age. The Reproductions of E. Gilliéron & Son. exhibition The Metropolitan Museum of Art, 17 May to 13 November 2011 on the website of the Metropolitan Museum of Art
 Bryan Burns: . Aegean Art for a Modern Age Blog of the Center for Hellenic Studies, 23rd Dec. 2011

Swiss archaeologists
Swiss artists
1850 births
1924 deaths